Azufral is a stratovolcano located in the department of Nariño in southern Colombia,  west of the town of Túquerres. It is the only volcano of the Western Ranges of the Colombian Andes. Its name derives from the Spanish word for sulfur, azufre. The volcano is considered semi-dormant but there are numerous fumaroles in the summit crater. There are also two other much smaller lakes in the crater, Laguna Negra and Laguna Cristal.

The volcano lies within a nature reserve, the Reserva Natural del Azufral, created in 1990. As Azufral is semi-dormant, there are no restrictions on ascending the volcano and visiting Laguna Verde: there is a road that climbs to within  from the summit, and the remaining distance can be covered on foot via a trail.

Gallery

See also 
 List of volcanoes in Colombia
 List of volcanoes by elevation

References 

Andean Volcanic Belt
Mountains of Colombia
Stratovolcanoes of Colombia
Quaternary Colombia
Quaternary volcanoes
Geography of Nariño Department
Nature reserves in Colombia
Four-thousanders of the Andes
Holocene stratovolcanoes